Li Yannian may refer to:
 Li Yannian (musician) (died 82 BCE), Chinese musician during the Han Dynasty
 Li Yannian (general) (1904–1974), Kuomintang lieutenant-general
 Li Yannian (People's Liberation Army commissar) (1928-), PLA combat hero, former deputy political commissar of Unit 54251